Valley of Hamon-Gog, a phrase from Ezekiel 39:11,15, literally means "Valley of the multitudes of Gog". It is to be the place where all of Israel buries the five-sixths of the army of Gog and Magog that are struck down by God.

See also
 Baal Hammon
 Ezekiel 39

References

Hebrew Bible valleys
Gog and Magog